Retusa is a genus of very small head-shield sea snails or barrel-bubble snails, marine gastropod mollusks in the family Retusidae.

Species
Species within the genus Retusa include:

 Retusa abyssicola Valdés, 2008
 Retusa acrobeles (R. B. Watson, 1883)
 † Retusa acrochone (Cossmann & Pissarro, 1900) 
 Retusa agulhasensis Thiele, 1925
 Retusa amboynensis (R. B. Watson, 1883)
 Retusa amphizosta (Watson, 1886)
 Retusa avenaria (R. B. Watson, 1883)
 Retusa atkinsoni (Tenison-Woods, 1876)
 Retusa canariensis (Nordsieck & Talavera, 1979)
 Retusa carpenteri (Hanley, 1859)
 Retusa cecillii (Philippi, 1844)
 Retusa chrysoma Burn in Burn & Bell, 1974
 Retusa chukchii Chaban, 2008
 Retusa complanata (Watson, 1883)
 Retusa concentrica (A. Adams, 1850)
 Retusa crebrisculpta (Monterosato, 1884)
 Retusa crispula (Watson, 1883)
 Retusa crossei (Bucquoy, Dautzenberg & Dollfus, 1886)
 Retusa delicatula (A. Adams, 1862)
 Retusa desgenettii (Audouin, 1826)
 Retusa diaphana Valdés, 2008
 Retusa elegantissima Habe, 1950
 † Retusa ennucleata (Powell & Bartrum, 1929) 
 Retusa famelica Watson, 1883
 Retusa frielei (Dall, 1881)
 Retusa galapagana Dall, 1919
 Retusa golikovi Chaban, 2004
 Retusa insolita Valdés, 2008
 Retusa instabilis Minichev, 1971
 Retusa laevisculpta (Granata-Grillo, 1877)
 Retusa lata Chaban & Chernyshev, 2013
 Retusa lenis Valdés, 2008
 Retusa leptekes (R. B. Watson, 1883)
 Retusa leptoeneilema (Brusina, 1866)
 Retusa leuca (R. B. Watson, 1883)
 Retusa longispirata (Yamakawa, 1911)
 Retusa mammillata (Philippi, 1836)
 Retusa mariei (Dautzenberg, 1889)
 Retusa mayoi (Dall, 1889)
 Retusa minima Yamakawa, 1911
 Retusa minutissima (Monterosato, 1878)
 Retusa montereyensis Smith & Gordon, 1948
 Retusa natalensis Barnard, 1963
 Retusa nicobarica Thiele, 1925
 Retusa nitidula (Lovén, 1846)
 Retusa obtusa (Montagu, 1803)
 Retusa operculata Minichev, 1966
 Retusa opima (Finlay, 1926)
 Retusa orientalis Thiele, 1925
 Retusa oruaensis (Webster, 1908)
 Retusa orycta (R. B. Watson, 1883)
 † Retusa otahuhuensis (Laws, 1950) 
 Retusa oviformis Thiele, 1925
 Retusa ovoides (Milaschewitsch, 1916)
 Retusa ovulina Lin, 1991
 Retusa parvula (Jeffreys, 1883)
 Retusa paziana Dall, 1919
 Retusa pelyx Burn in Burn & Bell, 1974
 Retusa perforata Thiele, 1925 
 Retusa pervia (Dall, 1889)
 Retusa pharetra Hedley, 1909
 † Retusa pressa Marwick, 1928 
 Retusa protumida (Hedley, 1903)
 Retusa pseudoglobosa Nomura, 1939
 Retusa pygmaea (A. Adams, 1850)
 Retusa sakuraii (Habe, 1958)
 Retusa sculpta (Gatliff & Gabriel, 1913)
 † Retusa segnis (Laws, 1940) 
 Retusa siberutensis Thiele, 1925
 † Retusa soror (Suter, 1917) 
 Retusa sosa Ev. Marcus & Er. Marcus, 1969
 Retusa spatha (R. B. Watson, 1883)
 Retusa striata (Hutton, 1873)
 Retusa succincta (A. Adams, 1862)
 Retusa sulcata (d'Orbigny, 1841)
 Retusa sulcata (Watson, 1883) is a secondary junior homonym of Retusa sulcata (d'Orbigny, 1841). No replacement name has been proposed, but the systematics of these small cephalaspids is very confused, and both species may end up in different genera after a proper re-evaluation of their status.
 Retusa sumatrana Thiele, 1925
 Retusa tarutana Smythe, 1979
 Retusa tenerifensis (Nordsieck & Talavera, 1979)
 Retusa tornata (Watson, 1886)
 Retusa toyamaensis (Habe, 1955)
 Retusa trunca Valdés, 2008
 Retusa truncatula (Bruguière, 1792)
 Retusa turrigera Melvill, 1910
 Retusa umbilicata (Montagu, 1803)
 Retusa variabilis (Milaschewitsch, 1912)
 Retusa waughiana Hedley, 1899
 Retusa xystrum Dall, 1919

Taxa inquirenda
 Retusa bysma Melvill, 1904 
 Retusa candidula (Locard, 1892)  (taxon inquirendum, name is based on a junior primary homonym.)
 Retusa ennurensis Preston, 1916
 Retusa multiquadrata Oberling, 1970 (taxon inquirendum; needs investigation)
 Retusa obesa (Locard, 1897)
 Retusa pusillina (Locard, 1897)
 Retusa robagliana (P. Fischer, 1869) (taxon inquirendum)
 Retusa semen (Reeve, 1855) (taxon inquirendum)
Species brought into synonymy
 Retusa alayoi (Espinosa & Ortea, 2004): synonym of Colinatys alayoi (Espinosa & Ortea, 2004)
 Retusa anderssoni Strebel, 1908: synonym of Diaphana anderssoni (Strebel, 1908)
 Retusa antarctica Melvill & Standen, 1912: synonym of Diaphana paessleri (Strebel, 1905)
 Retusa apiculata (Tate, 1879): synonym of Tornatina apiculata (Tate, 1879): synonym of Acteocina apiculata (Tate, 1879)
 Retusa bizona (A. Adams, 1850): synonym of Mnestia girardi (Audouin, 1826)
 Retusa caelata (Bush, 1885): synonym of Pyrunculus caelatus (Bush, 1885)
 Retusa carinensis de Gregorio, 1889: synonym of Retusa truncatula (Bruguière, 1792)
 Retusa cumberlandiana Strebel, 1908: synonym of Cylichna cumberlandiana (Strebel, 1908)
 Retusa desgenettesi (Audouin, 1827): synonym of Retusa desgenettii (Audouin, 1826)
 Retusa dilatata Pallary, 1904: synonym of Retusa truncatula (Bruguière, 1792)
 Retusa domita (Dall, 1889): synonym of Cylichnium domitum (Dall, 1908)
 Retusa eumicra (Crosse in Crosse & Fischer, 1865): synonym of Tornatina eumicra (Crosse, 1865): synonym of Acteocina eumicra (Crosse, 1865)
 Retusa fourierii (Audouin, 1826): synonym of Pyrunculus fourierii (Audouin, 1826)
 Retusa frigida Hedley, 1916: synonym of Diaphana paessleri (Strebel, 1905)
 Retusa gaimardi Finlay, 1927: synonym of Acteocina decorata (Pilsbry, 1904)
 Retusa girardi (Audouin, 1826): synonym of Ventomnestia girardi (Audouin, 1826)
 Retusa gordonis Yokoyama, 1927: synonym of Acteocina gordonis (Yokoyama, 1927)
 Retusa inflata Strebel, 1908: synonym of Diaphana inflata (Strebel, 1908)
 Retusa insignis (Pilsbry, 1904): synonym of Decorifer insignis (Pilsbry, 1904)
 Retusa lactea (Jeffreys, 1877): synonym of Diaphana lactea (Jeffreys, 1877)
 Retusa mariateresae Parenzan, 1970: synonym of Bulla striata Bruguière, 1792
 Retusa marshalli Sykes, 1904: synonym of Diaphana marshalli (Sykes, 1904)
 Retusa matusimana Nomura, 1939: synonym of Decorifer matusimanus (Nomura, 1939)
 Retusa obtusata: synonym of Retusa obtusa (Montagu, 1803)
 Retusa pellucida  (T. Brown, 1827): synonym of Retusa truncatula (Bruguière, 1792)
 Retusa pertenuis (Mighels, 1843): synonym of Retusa obtusa (Montagu, 1803)
 Retusa pfefferi Strebel, 1908: synonym of Diaphana pfefferi (Strebel, 1908)
 Retusa piriformis Nordsieck, 1972: synonym of Retusa truncatula (Bruguière, 1792)
 Retusa semen Thiele, 1925: synonym of Pyrunculus pyriformis (A. Adams, 1850)
 Retusa semisulcata (Philippi, 1836): synonym of Retusa truncatula (Bruguière, 1792)
 Retusa strigella (Lovén, 1846): synonym of Cylichnina umbilicata (Montagu, 1803): synonym of Retusa umbilicata (Montagu, 1803)
 Retusa subcylindrica (Brown, 1827): synonym of Cylichnina umbilicata (Montagu, 1803): synonym of Retusa umbilicata (Montagu, 1803)
 Retusa tohokuensis Nomura, 1939: synonym of Acteocina tohokuensis (Nomura, 1939)
 Retusa truncatoides Nomura, 1939: synonym of Acteocina truncatoides (Nomura, 1939)
 Retusa turrita Møller, 1842: synonym of Retusa obtusa (Montagu, 1803)

References

 Nordsieck, F. (1972). Die europäischen Meeresschnecken (Opisthobranchia mit Pyramidellidae; Rissoacea). Vom Eismeer bis Kapverden, Mittelmeer und Schwarzes Meer. Gustav Fischer, Stuttgart. XIII + 327 pp.
 Gofas, S.; Le Renard, J.; Bouchet, P. (2001). Mollusca, in: Costello, M.J. et al. (Ed.) (2001). European register of marine species: a check-list of the marine species in Europe and a bibliography of guides to their identification. Collection Patrimoines Naturels, 50: pp. 180–213
 Valdés, Á. (2008). Deep-sea "cephalaspidean" heterobranchs (Gastropoda) from the tropical southwest Pacific. In: Héros, V. et al. (eds) Tropical Deep-Sea Benthos 25. Mémoires du Muséum national d'Histoire naturelle. 196: 587-792.

External links
 Brown, T. (1827). Illustrations of the conchology of Great Britain and Ireland. Drawn from nature. W.H. Lizars and D. Lizars, Edinburgh and S. Highley, London. 144 pp., 52 pls
 Brown T. (1844). Illustrations of the Recent Conchology of Great Britain and Ireland, with the description and localities of all the species, marine, land, and fresh water. Ed. 2. London: Smith, Elder & Co. Drawn and Coloured from Nature. Second Edition, Greatly Enlarged
 Burch J.Q. (1945). [Untitled. Minutes of the Conchological Club of Southern California. 47: 5-26]
 Dall, W. H. (1921). Summary of the marine shellbearing mollusks of the northwest coast of America, from San Diego, California, to the Polar Sea, mostly contained in the collection of the United States National Museum, with illustrations of hitherto unfigured species. Bulletin of the United States National Museum. 112: 1-217, pls 1-22.
 Jeffreys, J. G. (1883). On the Mollusca procured during the cruise of H. M. S. Triton, between the Hebrides and Faeroes in 1882. Proceedings of the Zoological Society of London. (1883): 389-399, pl. 44
 Monterosato, T. A. di. (1884). Nomenclatura generica e specifica di alcune conchiglie mediterranee. Virzi, printed for the author, Palermo, 152 pp.
 CZN. (1959). Opinion 568. Protection under the plenary powers of the specific name "obtusa" Montagu, 1803, as published in the combination "Bulla obtusa" (class Gastropoda). Opinions and declarations rendered by the International Commission on Zoological Nomenclature. 20: 404-412.
 Iredale, T. (1915). Some more misused generic names. Proceedings of the Malacological Society of London. 11: 291-306

Retusidae